The 1961 Fresno State Bulldogs football team represented Fresno State College—now known as California State University, Fresno—as a member of the California Collegiate Athletic Association (CCAA) during the 1961 NCAA College Division football season. Led by third-year head coach Cecil Coleman, Fresno State compiled an overall record of 10–0 with a mark of 5–0 in conference play, winning the CCAA title for the fourth consecutive year. The Bulldogs played home games at Ratcliffe Stadium on the campus of Fresno City College in Fresno, California.

At the end of the season, Fresno State took part in a charity bowl game, the Mercy Bowl against Bowling Green. The game was played as a fundraiser in memory of 16 Cal Poly Mustangs football players killed in a plane crash following a game against Bowling Green a year earlier.

Schedule

Team players in the NFL/AFL
The following were selected in the 1962 NFL Draft.

The following were selected in the 1962 AFL Draft.

References

Fresno State
Fresno State Bulldogs football seasons
California Collegiate Athletic Association football champion seasons
College football undefeated seasons
Fresno State Bulldogs football